Alexander Ivanovich Achziger is a Kazakhstani-German professional ice hockey coach. He is currently the assistant coach of Kazakhstan men's national ice hockey team and KHL team Barys Astana.

References

1953 births
Living people
Russian ice hockey coaches
Sportspeople from Astana
Kazakhstani people of German descent